Barış Falay (born 9 April 1972) is a Turkish actor.

Biography
Barış Falay was born in Edremit, Balıkesir Province and his family is of Bosnian descent. He graduated in theatre from Ankara University. After working at the Ankara State Theatre for 2 years, he joined the İzmir City Theatre appearing in plays such as Hamlet, Üç Kuruşluk Opera, Misafir, Kamyon, Roberto Zucco, Kırmızı Yorgunları, Azizname, Barış, Bahar Noktası, Yaşar Ne Yaşar Ne Yaşamaz and Karar Kimin. He directed the plays Deniz Kızı Masalı and Bir Yaz Gecesi Rüyası, and taught at the theatre's school. Later Falay joined the Kocaeli Metropolitan Theatre.

He began his television career in sitcoms such as Tatlı Hayat, Yarım Elma and Dadı after which he played in the series Aliye. Between 2009 and 2011, he played Kerpeten Ali Kırgız in the series Ezel for which he won a number of acting awards. Falay played a lead role in the film Ya Sonra. Falay returned to television in 2011 with the series Al Yazmalım. From 2013 to 2015, he played Selim Serez on the television series Medcezir.

Filmography

References

External links 
 

1972 births
Living people
Ankara University alumni
People from Edremit, Balıkesir
Turkish male film actors
Turkish male stage actors
Turkish male television actors